The 1928 Humboldt State Lumberjacks football team represented Humboldt State College during the 1928 college football season. They competed as an independent. The 1928 season was their fourth season of existence and was the second consecutive year where they played only one other college team.

The 1928 Lumberjacks were led by second-year head coach Fred Telonicher. They played home games at Albee Stadium in Eureka, California. Humboldt State finished with a record of two wins and one loss (2–1). The Lumberjacks outscored their opponents 38–37 in the three games.

Schedule

Notes

References

Humboldt State
Humboldt State Lumberjacks football seasons
Humboldt State Lumberjacks football